János Terbócs or Terbocs ( or Ivan Terboč) was a Slovene Lutheran priest, dean, and writer in the 17th century in the Slovene March (Kingdom of Hungary).

He was probably born in Murska Sobota. He served for a time in Csepreg, and on May 5, 1616 he moved to Felsőlendva (Grad). In 1625, he was the dean of Murska Sobota and he signed the Lutheran document Formule Concordiae.

He died in Csepreg. Terbócs was the author of some Prekmurje Slovene hymns.

See also 
 List of Slovene writers and poets in Hungary

References 
 Vili Kerčmar: Evangeličanska cerkev na Slovenskem, Murska Sobota 1995.
 Muraszombati vend ev. egyházmegye
 Evangeličanska cerkvena občina Bodonci – ZGODOVINA

1650 deaths
People from Murska Sobota
Slovenian Lutheran clergy
Slovenian writers and poets in Hungary
Year of birth unknown